Toronto Neighbourhood Centres ("TNC") is an association of multi-service nonprofit neighbourhood centres located in communities across Toronto, Ontario, Canada. The current association includes 30 member agencies that provide supports to residents of their local geographic neighbourhoods, including social services, opportunities for association and enabling collective action to improve community conditions. Based on a historic "settlement house" model, these modern neighbourhood centres hold great promise for revitalizing community in a global era (see Yan, Miu Chung "Bridging the Fragmented Community: Revitalizing Settlement Houses in the Global Era", 2004 in Journal of Community PracticeVolume: 12 Issue: 1/2).

The TNC was founded in 1998, emerging from a previous network named "TANS" – Toronto Association of Neighbourhood Services. TANS was established in the early 1950s as an association of six (and later seven) multi-service settlement houses located in the former City of Toronto. The first settlement houses were established in Toronto between 1894 and 1914, and included Fred Victor Centre (1894), University Settlement Recreation Centre (1910), Central Neighbourhood House (1911) and St. Christopher House (1912). All of these organizations are still active members of the current Toronto Neighbourhood Centres association. The settlement movement began in 1883 with the establishment of the first settlement house, Toynbee Hall in London, England.

Further reading 

 Addams, J. (1910) Twenty Years at Hull-House with Autobiographical Notes, New York Macmillan.
 Barnett, S. A. (1884) ‘Settlements of university men in great towns. A paper read at St John’s, Oxford on 17 November 1883’, Oxford: The Chronicle Company. Reprinted in J. A. R. Pimlott (1935) Toynbee Hall. Fifty years of social progress 1884–1934, London: J. M. Dent. pp. 266–273.
 Carson, M. (1990) Settlement Folk. Social thought and the American settlement movement, 1885–1930, Chicago: University of Chicago Press. Outstanding study of the early days of the American settlement movement.
 Davis, A. F. (1984) Spearheads for Reform. The social settlement movement and the progressive movement 1890–1914, New Brunswick, Rutgers University Press. 326+xxiv pages.
 Meacham, S. (1987) Toynbee Hall and Social Reform 1880–1914. The search for community, New Haven: Yale University Press.
 Pimlott, J. A. R. (1935) Toynbee Hall. Fifty years of social progress 1884–1934, London: Dent.
 Vicinus, M. (1985) Independent Women. Work and community for single women 1850–1920, London: Virago.

External links 
 
 International Federation of Settlements and Neighborhood Centers (IFS) - Further information about the settlement house movement, including links to national associations established in a number of countries.

Non-profit organizations based in Toronto
Settlement houses